Gwydir Shire is a local government area located in the New England region of New South Wales, Australia. The northern boundary of the Shire is located adjacent to the border between New South Wales and Queensland.

The Shire was established on 17 March 2004, when the Yallaroi, Bingara, and a northern portion of the Barraba shires were merged. The seat of the Council is located in the major centre of the area in the town of Bingara. Other major towns include Warialda.

The Mayor of the Gwydir Shire Council is Cr. John Coulton, who is unaligned with any political party.

Towns and localities 
The towns of Gwydir Shire include Warialda and Bingara, and the villages/localities include Back Creek, Bangheet, Caroda, Cobbadah, Coolatai, Copeton, Crooble, Croppa Creek, Dinoga, Elcombe, Gineroi, Gravesend, Gulf Creek, Gundamulda, North Star, Pallal, Riverview, Upper Bingara, Upper Horton, Warialda Rail, Yagobe, and Yallaroi. The locality of Myall Creek is split between Gwydir Shire (the southern part of the locality), Inverell Shire (the northern part of the locality) and Barraba is somewhat split between Tamworth Regional Council (The southern part of the locality) and Gwydir Shire (The northern part of the locality)

History 
The first local government in the Gwydir region was the Bingara Municipality, incorporated to serve the town of Bingara in early 1889. The town of Warialda followed on 30 March 1900.

The Warialda and Bingara municipalities amalgamated into their respective shires on 29 December 1924 and 17 December 1943 respectively.

On 17 March 2004, the Yallaroi, Bingara and Barraba Shires were abolished. Yallaroi and Bingara were fully amalgamated into the newly formed Gwydir Shire, while Barraba was split between Gwydir, which received  (41%) of its area and 340 people in the former shire's north, and the newly formed Tamworth Regional Council.

Demographics
Aboriginal and Torres Strait Islander people made up 3.8 per cent of the population which is marginally above both the national and state averages of 2.5 per cent. The median age of people in the Gwydir Shire was 45 years; higher than the national median of 37 years. Children aged 0 – 14 years made up 19.0 per cent of the population and people aged 65 years and over made up 22.6 per cent of the population. Of people in the area aged 15 years and over, 50.8 per cent were married and 11.1 per cent were either divorced or separated.

Between the 2006 census and the 2011 census the Gwydir Shire experienced negative population growth in both absolute and real terms. When compared with total population growth of Australia for the same periods, being 5.78 per cent and 8.32 per cent respectively, population growth in the Gwydir local government area was significantly lower than the national average. The median weekly income for residents within the Gwydir Shire was significantly below the national average.

At the 2011 census, the proportion of residents in the Gwydir local government area who stated their ancestry as Australian or Anglo-Saxon exceeded 92 per cent of all residents (national average was 65.2 per cent). In excess of 77 per cent of all residents in the Gwydir Shire nominated a religious affiliation with Christianity at the 2011 census, which was significantly higher than the national average of 50.2 per cent. Meanwhile, as at the census date, compared to the national average, households in the Gwydir local government area had a significantly lower than average proportion (2 per cent) where two or more languages are spoken (national average was 20.4 per cent); and a significantly higher proportion (96.7 per cent) where English only was spoken at home (national average was 76.8 per cent).

Selected historical census data

Historical population data

Populations for the Yallaroi and Bingara Shires (including municipalities) over time are listed below. Totals are not provided as it is difficult to quantify the component from Bingara Shire. Using the Australian Bureau of Statistics' time series data and census collection district figures for 2006, this component had a population of 591 in 1996, 447 in 2001 and 340 in 2006.

The census populations of the Gwydir Shire area were:

Council

Current composition and election method
Gwydir Shire Council is made up of nine Councillors elected proportionally as a single ward. All Councillors are elected for a fixed four-year term of office. The Mayor is elected by the Councillors at the first meeting of the Council. The most recent election was held on 10 September 2016, and the makeup of the Council is as follows:

The current Council, elected in 2016, in order of election, is:

References 

 
Local government areas of New South Wales
New England (New South Wales)
North West Slopes